John Snell (1638-1717) was a member of the British House of Commons representing  Exeter from 1702-1708.

Snell was the son of Rev. John Snell of Thurlestone Devon and was born about 1638. His father as a Royalist had been dispossessed of his living during the Commonwealth. He was made Freeman of Exeter in 1674,  and sheriff from 1681 to 1682. He was nominated an alderman when King Charles II of England presented a new charter to the city in 1684. He was twice more Mayor -  1689 to 1690, and 1700 to 1701. Foster describes him as "An alderman of the city of Exeter what he hath to do as well to his own honour as that of the city, several times represented in parliament "

He remained MP for Exeter from 1702-1708. 

Snell  married Anne Wakerell of Chawleigh, Devon on 25 July 1656 at Saint Peter Cathedral. They had a son and 3 daughters.

References 

 History of Parliament: The Commons 1691-1714
 Foster Calumny revisited

1638 births
1717 deaths
Members of the Parliament of Great Britain for Exeter
British MPs 1707–1708
Mayors of Exeter
English MPs 1702–1705
English MPs 1705–1707